Hillcrest, also known as Hillcrest Mines, is an urban community in the Rocky Mountains within the Municipality of Crowsnest Pass in southwest Alberta, Canada. It was once a hamlet under the jurisdiction of Improvement District (ID) No. 5 prior to 1979 when the former ID No. 5 amalgamated with four other municipalities to form Crowsnest Pass.

History 

Hillcrest was named after Charles Plummer Hill, an early coal prospector and entrepreneur who also founded Porthill, Idaho. Hill grew up and was educated in Seaford, Delaware before moving northwest. The Hillcrest Coal and Coke Company, incorporated on January 31, 1905, began constructing the community the same year, and the Canadian Pacific Railway soon built a spur, for transporting coal from the Hillcrest Mine, and a train station. Hillcrest soon grew to a population of about 1,000. The post office opened in 1907 with Mr. Hill as the postmaster.

Although the mine was successful, and considered one of the safest in the region, an underground explosion in 1914 (Canada's worst mine disaster) killed 189 people — almost twenty percent of the community's population and half the mine's workforce. A further explosion in 1926 killed two others. After the mine closed in 1939, Hillcrest experienced a period of economic decline.

In 1979, the former I.D. No. 5, which included the former hamlet of Hillcrest, amalgamated with Bellevue, Blairmore, Coleman and Frank to form the Municipality of Crowsnest Pass.

Demographics 

See also 
List of communities in Alberta
List of designated places in Alberta

References 

Crowsnest and its People, Crowsnest Pass Historical Society, 1979.
https://www.newz.it/2017/06/20/storia-di-emigrazione-calabrese-103-anni-fa-la-tragedia-hillcrest-mines-dove-persero-la-vita-4-minatori-di-mammola/280360
Tragedia a Hillcrest Mines 19-6-1914 - Storia di emigrazione Calabrese, dove persero la vita 4 minatori di Mammola RC

Designated places in Alberta
Former hamlets in Alberta
Localities in Crowsnest Pass, Alberta